Walter Chalk Wardwell (January 27, 1859 – September 29, 1940) was a Massachusetts politician who served as the Mayor of Cambridge, Massachusetts. Before becoming mayor, he was appointed as Deputy Sheriff of Cambridge in 1893.

Personal life 
Walter was born on January 27, 1859, in Richmond, Virginia. He was born to Burnham Wardwell and Sarah J. Goodale. On January 12, 1888, Walter married Grace Gardner Jones in Cambridge, Massachusetts. He died on September 29, 1940 in Cambridge.

Notes

1859 births
Massachusetts city council members
Mayors of Cambridge, Massachusetts
1940 deaths